The Gorowa, also known as Fyomi are a Cushitic ethnic group and Iraqw Comunities inhabiting the Manyara and Dodoma regions in Tanzania. They speak the Gorowa language as a mother tongue, which belongs to the South Cushitic branch of the Afro-Asiatic family.  Estimating the Gorowa population is difficult, as ethnic affiliation or language is not recorded in the national census. The number of Gorowa speakers is estimated to be 132,748, though it is important to recognize that some Gorowa people may not speak the language, so this number will not correspond exactly to the population.

Early history

Identification and location 
The Gorowa have been in their present location for approximately 250–300 years (about 10 generations).

Demography 
The population of the Gorowa at the turn of the previous century was estimated to be between 3000 and 8000 people.

Daily life and culture 
Traditional Gorowa belief systems see the natural world as sacred, and a suite of indigenous land management practices, inspired by myth, have developed around this view. Gorowa rituals and social gatherings often take place in forests and sacred groves carefully preserved for these purposes, that large trees (especially ficus) are protected as dwellings of rain-bringing sprits, and various unsustainable land use practices were prohibited.

References

Ethnic groups in Tanzania
Indigenous peoples of East Africa
Cushitic-speaking peoples